KEFC may refer to:

 KEFC-LP, a low-power radio station (100.5 FM) licensed to Turlock, California, United States
 the ICAO code for Belle Fourche Municipal Airport, in Belle Fourche, South Dakota